Vermont Lake is a lake in Douglas County, in the U.S. state of Minnesota.

A number of the first settlers being natives of Vermont caused the name to be selected.

See also
List of lakes in Minnesota

References

Lakes of Minnesota
Lakes of Douglas County, Minnesota